Oshovo is a rural locality (a village) in Bolshekochinskoye Rural Settlement, Kochyovsky District, Perm Krai, Russia. The population was 16 as of 2010. There is 1 street.

Geography 
Oshovo is located 20 km east of Kochyovo (the district's administrative centre) by road. Vezhayka is the nearest rural locality.

References 

Rural localities in Kochyovsky District